Harvey Knuckles (born October 3, 1958) is an American former basketball player. He was a second round draft pick in the 1981 NBA draft and played professionally in the United States and Europe.

Knuckles, a 6'6" small forward, played collegiately at the University of Toledo from 1977 to 1981, where he led the Rockets to two consecutive NCAA tournament berths (1979, 1980).  Knuckles scored 1,488 points (12.9 per game) in his Toledo career.  As a senior in 1980–81, Knuckles averaged 22 points and 7.3 rebounds per game and was named Mid-American Conference Player of the Year.

After graduating from Toledo, Knuckles was drafted by the Los Angeles Lakers in the second round of the 1981 NBA Draft.  He failed to make the team, instead playing in the Continental Basketball Association and then in England, Switzerland and France.  After stints as an assistant at Toledo and working in a bank, Knuckles returned to France, where he played professionally late into his forties.

References

External links
Draft Review profile

1958 births
Living people
American expatriate basketball people in France
American expatriate basketball people in Switzerland
American expatriate basketball people in the United Kingdom
American men's basketball players
Basketball players from Arkansas
Los Angeles Lakers draft picks
Maine Lumberjacks players
Player-coaches
Small forwards
Toledo Rockets men's basketball coaches
Toledo Rockets men's basketball players